Cryptarrhena is a genus of orchids (family Orchidaceae). It consists of 3 known species, native to the New World Tropics.

List of species 
 Cryptarrhena guatemalensis  Schltr. (1911) - Central America, Trinidad, South America as far south as Brazil and Peru
 Cryptarrhena kegelii  Rchb.f. (1852) - South America as far south as Brazil and Bolivia
 Cryptarrhena lunata  R.Br.  (1816) - Mexico, Central America, Colombia, Peru, Trinidad, Jamaica

References

External links 
 
 

Orchids of South America
Zygopetalinae genera
Taxa named by Robert Brown (botanist, born 1773)
Zygopetalinae